The Tule Springs Hills are a mountain range in eastern Lincoln County, Nevada. The Tule Desert lies to the west. The Mormon Mountains and East Mormon Mountains are to the southwest, the Clover Mountains to the north and the Beaver Dam Mountains of Utah are to the east.

On the southwest the hills are separated from the East Mormon Mountains by the narrow Toquop Gap through which the Toquop Wash drains the south end of the Tule Desert.

References 

Mountain ranges of Nevada
Mountain ranges of Lincoln County, Nevada